Siiri Sisask (born 21 September 1968) is an Estonian singer, stage and film actress, and politician.

Sisask was born in Rapla. Her older brother was composer Urmas Sisask. She was a member of X Riigikogu, representing the Res Publica Party.

She has been a member of several notable musical collectives, including:
 1986: T-Klaas ensemble – lead singer
 1987: Ruja ensemble – lead singer
 1988:  Vitamiin ensemble – lead singer
 Ultima Thule – lead singer.

Solo discography
Hold Me, Wind/We'll Meet Another Time (1996)
1st Acoustic Graffiti (1996) 
Mis maa see on (1998)
Jälg (2002)
Laulud hingest... (with the Revalia Kammermeeskoor; 2003)
Ürg ja jõud (2003)
We've Been A While (2003)
Kuu lõhn (2005)
Teine jälg (2006)
Taarka (2008)
11 (2011)
Lingua mea (2010)
Hommikupuu (2012)
Kuristi kohal (2016)

Filmography
Arabella, mereröövli tütar (1982)
Karoliine hõbelõng (1985)
Naerata ometi  (1985)
Õnnelind flamingo  (1986)
Varastatud kohtumine (1989)
Taarka (2008)

References

External links
 

1968 births
Living people
21st-century Estonian women singers
Estonian pop singers
English-language singers from Estonia
Estonian musical theatre actresses
Estonian stage actresses
Estonian film actresses
20th-century Estonian actresses
21st-century Estonian actresses
Res Publica Party politicians
Members of the Riigikogu, 2003–2007
Women members of the Riigikogu
People from Rapla
20th-century Estonian women singers
21st-century Estonian women politicians